The National Forestry Commission of Mexico ( or CONAFOR) is a government agency tasked with developing, supporting and promoting the conservation and restoration of Mexico's forests, as well participating in the development of plans, programs and policies for sustainable forestry development. It is part of the Secretariat of the Environment and Natural Resources and was created on April 4, 2001.

References

External links

Mexico
Nature conservation in Mexico
Forestry in Mexico